Contributions to Indian Sociology is a triannual peer-reviewed academic journal covering sociology with an emphasis on South Asian societies and cultures. It was established in 1957 by Louis Dumont and David Francis Pocock. It is published by SAGE Publishing in association with the Institute of Economic Growth. The journal ceased publication in 1966. A new series commenced publication the next year at the initiative of Triloki Nath Madan, with volume numbering re-starting at 1. Published annually till 1974, it became a biannual publication in 1975. From 1999, it has been published thrice a year. The editor-in-chief is Rita Brara (Institute of Economic Growth).

Abstracting and indexing
The journal is abstracted and indexed in:

According to the Journal Citation Reports, the journal has a 2021 impact factor of 0.938.

References

External links

Triannual journals
Publications established in 1957
SAGE Publishing academic journals
English-language journals
Sociology journals